Marianne Martin (born November 1, 1957 in Fenton, Michigan) is an American road racing cyclist.  She won the Tour de France Féminin for women in 1984, covering the  course in 29 hours, 39 minutes, and 2 seconds. The race was held in July and had 18 stages. The women's tour ran the same time as the men's and finished 2–3 hours before the men each day.

The year she won the Tour de France Martin suffered from anemia earlier in that year and had been riding poorly. After recovering, Martin was added to the United States team by National Team Coach Eddie Borysewicz. Martin earned the King of the Mountains polka-dot jersey in the 12th stage that went over two passes in the Alps and finished in Grenoble. She took the yellow jersey (maillot jaune) of the overall lead in the general classification (GC) in stage 14. She held on to the yellow jersey all the way through the 18th and final stage into Paris, finishing three minutes and 17 seconds ahead of the second-place finisher, and leading the United States to a first place finish in the team competition ahead of the Netherlands and France. The streets were said to contain more two million spectators watching the race.

Martin, along with runners up Heleen Hage (Dutch) and Deborah Shumway (American), stood on the podium with male champions Laurent Fignon, Bernard Hinault and Greg LeMond. Fignon's prizes were valued at over $225,000 (adjusted to 2016). Martin was awarded a trophy and $1,000.

Martin was inducted into the 2012 Boulder (Colorado) Sports Hall of Fame. She was a 2020 inductee to the US Bicycling Hall of Fame.

References

1957 births
Living people
People from Fenton, Michigan
Sportspeople from Metro Detroit
American female cyclists
21st-century American women